John Hutton (14 July 1659 – 2 March 1731) of Marske near Richmond, North Yorkshire was a British politician. He was the Member of Parliament for Richmond, Yorkshire in 1701–1702.

His son, Matthew Hutton, became archbishop of York and archbishop of Canterbury, following in the footsteps of their ancestor, Matthew Hutton.

He died aged 71.

References

1659 births
1731 deaths
English MPs 1701–1702
People from Richmondshire (district)
Place of birth missing